Paul Tep Im Sotha Samath (1934–May 1975) was a Cambodian Roman Catholic priest and the first apostolic prefect of Battambang. Ordained in 1959, he was the second native Cambodian to become a Catholic priest after Simon Chhem Yen.

Tep Im was raised by his mother to be a Catholic, and at a young age began to be sent to various schools abroad, such as in Vietnam, France, and Italy. After his ordination at the Notre-Dame de Paris, Tep Im took further theological studies in Rome. However, growing concerns for his country's problems as well as a decisive conversation with American bishop Fulton Sheen would lead him to decide against a monastic life and return to Cambodia by August 1962. Upon the establishment of the Apostolic Prefecture of Battambang, Tep Im was installed as its apostolic prefect on September 26, 1968, a position he remained in up to his death under the Khmer Rouge regime in early May 1975.

Tep Im has been described by historian Milton Osborne as a priest with remarkable understanding of both the Catholic faith and Cambodian society. A boarding house for secondary and tertiary-level students in Battambang was named after him. In June 2015, the Catholic Church officially opened an inquiry into Tep Im's presumed martyrdom, alongside others such as Joseph Chhmar Salas who died during the Cambodian genocide.

References

1934 births
1975 deaths
20th-century Roman Catholic martyrs
20th-century Roman Catholic priests
Cambodian religious leaders
Cambodian Roman Catholics
People who died in the Cambodian genocide
Pontifical University of Saint Thomas Aquinas alumni